Saint Omer is an unincorporated community in Adams Township, Decatur County, Indiana.

History
Saint Omer was laid out in 1834. It was possibly named for Saint-Omer in France.

Geography

References

Unincorporated communities in Decatur County, Indiana
Unincorporated communities in Indiana